Andinus is an Illyrian god worshipped among the Dardanians in Moesia Superior. The only trace left is a name carved on an altar dedicated by a beneficiarus ("a foreigner"). Variants of the name such as Andia or Andio were common among the Dardanians. As the region of Kosovo was located on the road that went from the Adriatic Sea to Dacia, personal names like Ulpius Andinus or Ulpia Andia appeared among new citizens in the area during the reign of Trajan.

See also 
 Illyrian mythology

References

Bibliography 

Illyrian gods